The 2010 NCAA Division I Men's Swimming and Diving Championships were contested in March 2010 at the McCorkle Aquatic Pavilion at Ohio State University in Columbus, Ohio at the 87th annual NCAA-sanctioned swim meet to determine the team and individual national champions of Division I men's collegiate swimming and diving in the United States.

Texas topped the team standings, finishing 30.5 points ahead of California. It was the Longhorns' tenth overall men's team title.

Team standings
Note: Top 10 only
(H) = Hosts
(DC) = Defending champions
Full results

See also
List of college swimming and diving teams

References

NCAA Division I Men's Swimming and Diving Championships
NCAA Division I Swimming And Diving Championships
NCAA Division I Men's Swimming And Diving Championships
NCAA Division I Men's Swimming and Diving Championships